Chijioke is a given name. Notable people with the given name include:

Chijioke Amu-Nnadi (born 1962), Nigerian poet and author
Chijioke Ejiogu (born 1984), Nigerian soccer player
Chijioke Nwakodo, Nigerian politician and businessman
Chijioke Onyenegecha (born 1983), Canadian football player